2015 Bandy World Championship 2015 was the XXXVth Bandy World Championship. At the FIB congress held during the XXXIVth World Championship in 2014, it was announced that Khabarovsk in Russia had been elected as host city. It was also decided the Group A tournament would be played around the end of March/beginning of April, which means it would take place when the national bandy leagues in the major bandy playing countries, Finland, Norway, Russia and Sweden, would be finished for the season. Group B was played between February 1 and 6 and hit a new record attendance, already before the match for the bronze and the final.

High profile people who visited the Group A tournament include the Prime Minister of Russia, Dmitry Medvedev, and the President of Ice Hockey Federation of Russia, the legendary goaltender Vladislav Tretiak.

The mascots of the games were a bear and a tiger, named Тоша and Ероша, were inspired by the animals in the coat of arms of Khabarovsk.

Ukraine refused to take part in the Russian-hosted championship because of the  Russian annexation of Crimea the previous year.

Host selection
On 5 December 2013, the Russian news agency AmurMedia (which quoted Russian Internet site Sportbox.ru) reported that the decision on host city was made, after a decision by the working committee of FIB.

The candidates were:
Minsk, Belarus 
Helsinki, Finland 
Khabarovsk, Russia 

Minsk withdrew its candidacy in August 2013. Khabarovsk won over Helsinki because there is an indoor arena in the city.

Participating teams

Division A

Division B 

Latvia won Division B in 2014 and was thus promoted to Division A for 2015. However, the Latvians made an application to play in Division B this year too, and this was approved by the Federation of International Bandy. Latvia was therefore playing in both divisions this year. This was made possible by the divisions not being played at the same time, Division B was being played in early February while Division A was being played in late March/early April.

Venues

Division A 
After drawn games in the group stage, a penalty shootout is held to determine final placings in the event of teams finishing on equal points

Preliminary round

Group A 

All times are local (UTC+10).

Group B

Knockout stage

Quarter-finals

Semi-finals

Third place game

Final

Consolation tournament

7th place game

5th place game

Final standings

Statistics

Goalscorers
15 goals

  Andrey Kabanov

13 goals

  Yevgeny Ivanushkin

11 goals

  Patrik Nilsson
  Sergey Yusupov

9 goals

  Nikolai Rustad Jensen
  Sondre Kristoffersen
  Sergey Lomanov, Jr.

8 goals

  Daniel Andersson
  Christian Waaler

7 goals

  Christoffer Edlund
  Mikko Lukkarila
  Sergey Pochkunov
  Daren Richardson
  Denis Slautin

6 goals

  Maksim Blem
  Rauan Issaliev
  Sami Laakkonen
  Pavel Ryazantsev
  Pyotr Zakharov

5 goals

  Jacob Blucher
  Yevgeny Dergayev
  Pavel Dubovik
  Nikita Ivanov
  Alexander Nasonov
  Lauris Ziemiņš

4 goals

  Marius Austad
  Vyacheslav Bratchenko
  Kevin Brown
  Adam Gilljam
  Jonathan Keseley
  Alexander Kozlov
  Fredrik Randsborg
  Ivan Shevtsov

3 goals

  Leonid Bedarev
  Sergey Chernetsskiy
  Tommi Hauska
  Maksim Ishkeldin
  Jonas Nilsson
  Iskander Nugmanov
  Konstantin Savchenko

2 goals

  Artur Befus
  Mike Carman
  Johan Esplund
  Maxim Gavrilenko
  Fritjof Hagberg
  Sondre Hammerstad
  Pekka Hiltunen
  Magnus Hogevold
  Jūlijs Kadnajs
  Mikael Lickteig
  Teemu Määttä
  Petter Renstrom Moem
  Ilari Moisala
  Daniel Mossberg
  Erik Säfström
  Aleksandr Tyukavin

1 goal

  Ville Aaltonen
  Daniel Berlin
  Alan Dzhusoyev
  Johan Östblom
  Ruslan Galyautdinov
  Romans Glazkov
  Anatoly Golubkov
  Sergey Gorchakov
  Vasily Granovskiy
  Per Hellmyrs
  Maxim Koshelev
  Jegor Kudrjavcev
  Markus Kumpuoja
  Maksim Matveev
  Andrey Morokov
  Eetu Peuhuri
  David Plaunt
  Christian Randsborg
  Sergey Shaburov
  Brett Stolpestad
  Jonas Tjomsland

Source:

Division B

Preliminary round

Group A

Group B 
Matches in Group B are 60 minutes in duration rather than the standard 90 minutes.

Knockout stage

Quarter-finals

7th place game
The match was 60 minutes rather than standard 90 minutes.

5th place game
The match was 60 minutes rather than standard 90 minutes.

8th place game
The match was 60 minutes rather than standard 90 minutes.

Semi-finals

Third place game

Final

Final standings

Broadcasting
 Russia: VGTRK
 Sweden: TV12
 International: Online at http://bandyvm2015.ru/en/news/?newsid=268

Notes

References

External links
 Official homepage

2015
World Championship
2015 in Russian sport
World Championships,2015
Sport in Khabarovsk
April 2015 sports events in Russia
March 2015 sports events in Russia
International sports boycotts